This page covers all the important events in the sport of tennis in 2007. Primarily, it provides the results of notable tournaments throughout the year on both the ATP and WTA Tours, the Davis Cup, and the Fed Cup.

News

January
See: 2007 ATP Tour, 2007 WTA Tour
1 – In the Next Generation Adelaide International for the first time in history besides the Tennis Masters Cup a round-robin competition is in use to replace the normally used 32 player brackets. The new system will be used in several other tournaments throughout the season. tennis.com
2 – Lleyton Hewitt wins his first match in three months. Hewitt did not play any competitive matches after the 2006 Davis Cup loss versus Argentina. He was leading 6–1, 4–2 when his opponent Janko Tipsarević retired with a leg injury. Kristian Pless defeats David Nalbandian in a first round surprise in Chennai. bbc.co.uk yahoo.com
3 – Mark Philippoussis is forced to retire after hyperextending his knee during his second match at the 2007 Hopman Cup versus Jérôme Haehnel. An MRI showed that he had torn cartilage in his knee, forcing him to miss the 2007 Australian Open. yahoo.com
4 – Women world #1 Justine Henin announces her withdrawal from 2007 Australian Open for personal reasons, which appear to be the breakup of her marriage. espn.com
5 – Nadia Petrova and Dmitry Tursunov capture the 2007 Hopman Cup for Russia by beating Spain's Anabel Medina Garrigues and Tommy Robredo in the final. yahoo.com
6 – In the 2007 ATP Tour, Ivan Ljubičić beat Andy Murray in the final of Qatar ExxonMobil Open. In the 2007 WTA Tour the first wins go to Dinara Safina (Mondial Australian Women's Hardcourts) and Jelena Janković (ASB Classic) who beat Martina Hingis and Vera Zvonareva in the finals, respectively. bbc.co.uk, abc.net, nbc10.com
7 – In 2007 ATP Tour finals, Xavier Malisse (Chennai Open) and Novak Djokovic (Next Generation Adelaide International) were too strong for Stefan Koubek and Chris Guccione respectively. tennis-x.com, yahoo.com
9 – Rafael Nadal withdraws in his first round match in Sydney which he played against Chris Guccione. Nadal did not take any risk for the upcoming Australian Open. smh.com.au
10 – Also Nikolay Davydenko withdraws in Sydney to increase his chances of participation in Melbourne at the Australian Open. Davydenko withdrew after Paul-Henri Mathieu won the first set 6–4. Venus Williams announces her withdrawal for the Australian Open due to a wrist injury. mosnews.com, usatoday.com
12 – Kim Clijsters wins the Medibank International being the first to beat Jelena Janković in 2007, 4–6, 7–6, 6–4 in the final. Anna Chakvetadze defeats fellow Russian Vasilisa Bardina in the Moorilla Hobart International final. abc.net.au, msn.com
13 – Andy Roddick is the first to beat world number one Roger Federer in 2007 as he wins the AAMI Kooyong Classic 6–2, 3–6, 6–3. It was Roddick's second win over Federer in his career, the last one being August 2003; however, it does not rank as an official victory. In the men's competition James Blake successfully defends his Medibank International title, beating Carlos Moyà in the final. David Ferrer beat Tommy Robredo in an all Spanish final in the Heineken Open in New Zealand. bbc.co.uk, yahoo.com, abc.net.au
15 – Mardy Fish upsets Ivan Ljubičić in the first round of the 2007 Australian Open. The American beats the fourth seeded Croat 4–6, 7–6, 6–4, 6–4. Andy Roddick and Jo-Wilfried Tsonga equaled the tournament record of the longest tie-break with 38 points. Tsonga won the tie-break 20–18, but Roddick recovered to go through in four sets. For the first time in the history of the tournaments fans riot near the courts. The rioting fans were of Serbian and Croatian origin. australianopen.com
16 – The heat is the biggest opponent during the second day of the Australian Open. Maria Sharapova escapes versus Camille Pin as she squanders a 5–0 lead in the final set, but still wins the set 9–7, with Pin being two points away from victory serving for the match at 7–6. Andy Murray defeats Alberto Martín 6–0, 6–0, 6–1, winning sixteen games in a row. australianopen.com
17 – Many matches are affected by rain, also the match between Russian Marat Safin, seeded 26, and Israeli qualifier Dudi Sela. Marat Safin wisely requests that play be suspended while noticeably out of the match with Sela up two sets to one, six games to five, and 30–30. After the delay, Safin returned to win the fourth set and then the final set 6–0 to advance. 2006 finalist Marcos Baghdatis loses to Gaël Monfils 7–6, 6–2, 2–6, 6–0, while 24th seed Juan Carlos Ferrero loses against Danai Udomchoke. australianopen.com
18 – Unseeded Juan Ignacio Chela defeats 17th seeded Jarkko Nieminen 6–3, 2–6, 6–4, 6–4. Australian Alicia Molik, clawed her way into the third round against Kaia Kanepi after being down one set, 1–6, 6–3, 6–2. The only seeded Australian woman in the draw, Samantha Stosur, fell to Croat Jelena Kostanić Tošić, 6–4, 2–6, 6–2. Young American Ashley Harkleroad upset number 17 Anna-Lena Grönefeld, 6–2, 6–2. australianopen.com
19 – David Ferrer overcome being two sets to love down against Radek Štěpánek to beat the Czech 6–3 in the fifth and final set. The matchup of the day was two former world number ones in Russian Marat Safin and American Andy Roddick, Roddick advanced in a hard-fought four-set match 7–6. Former world number one Serena Williams survived a miserable first set to defeat number 5 fiery Russian Nadia Petrova 1–6, 7–5, 6–3. australianopen.com
20 – The last Australian man in competition, Lleyton Hewitt can not counter the speedy and crafty game shown by Chilean Fernando González, as González wins 6–2, 6–2, 5–7, 6–4. Vera Zvonareva, surprisingly defeated number 13 seed Ana Ivanovic soundly 6–1, 6–2. australianopen.com
21 – Unseeded Lucie Šafářová advanced to the quarterfinals courtesy of a 6–4, 6–3 surprising upset of defending champion and number two seed Amélie Mauresmo. Tenth seed Nicole Vaidišová posted a 6–3, 6–3 upset of seventh seed Elena Dementieva. Rising star Israeli Shahar Pe'er caused another upset by winning a 6–4, 6–2 over third seeded Russian Svetlana Kuznetsova. Serena Williams, defeats eleventh-seed Jelena Janković in a 6–3, 6–2 win. australianopen.com
22 – Rafael Nadal recovers from being behind twice during his match against Andy Murray before winning 6–1 in the final set. Fernando González upsets fifth seed James Blake in straight sets, 7–5, 6–4, 7–6 to face Nadal in the quarter final. Tommy Haas defeats eighth seeded David Nalbandian in four sets, while Anna Chakvetadze demolishes the eighth seed woman Patty Schnyder 6–4, 6–1. australianopen.com
23 – Justine Henin-Hardenne announces the reason for her Australian Open withdrawal. She and her husband Pierre-Yves Hardenne are planning their divorce. In the first quarter finals played Tommy Robredo fights hard but is unable to win a set against Roger Federer. Andy Roddick has no problems with fellow American Mardy Fish in a 6–2, 6–2, 6–2 meeting. Nicole Vaidišová advances to the semi finals after beating Lucie Šafářová 6–1, 6–4. Serena Williams does the same as she beat Shahar Pe'er 8–6 in the third set. australianopen.com
24 – Second seed Rafael Nadal and third seed Nikolay Davydenko both lose in the quarter finals against Fernando González and Tommy Haas respectively. González impressed to beat Nadal in straight sets 6–2, 6–4, 6–3, while Haas needed all five sets to beat the Russian. No surprises in the women's competition as first seed Maria Sharapova beats a hard fighting Anna Chakvetadze 7–6, 7–5 and Kim Clijsters overcome losing the first set against Martina Hingis, winning 3–6, 6–4, 6–3. australianopen.com
25 – Andy Roddick is having an off day as Roger Federer shows a good form and demolishes the American 6–4, 6–0, 6–2 to become the first man to reach the final. Maria Sharapova has no problems beating Kim Clijsters in her semi final tie and eases to the final 6–4, 6–2. Serena Williams wins a tough first set against Nicole Vaidišová and plays herself to victory in the second, winning 7–6, 6–4. australianopen.com
26 – Fernando González eases into the final to face Roger Federer, beating Tommy Haas 6–1, 6–3, 6–1 in the semi final. Cara Black and Liezel Huber claim the Australian Open women's doubles title with a 6–4 6–7 6–1 victory over Chinese Taipei representatives Chan Yung-jan and Chuang Chia-jung. australianopen.com
27 – Serena Williams claims the Australian Open women's singles title defeating Maria Sharapova 6–1, 6–2 in the final. She became the first unseeded winner since Chris O'Neill in 1978. Despite her lost final Sharapova becomes the world's new number one female player. Bob and Mike Bryan successfully defend their Australian Open title in the men's doubles as they are too strong for the Swedish-Belarusian combination Jonas Björkman and Max Mirnyi 7–5, 7–5.australianopen.com
28 – Roger Federer becomes the first player to win three consecutive Grand Slam titles twice in his career as he beats Fernando González 7–6, 6–4, 6–4 to win the Australian Open without losing a single set. He became the first player to accomplish this in a Grand Slam Tournament since Björn Borg at Roland Garros in 1980. In their third Grand Slam mixed doubles final Elena Likhovtseva and Daniel Nestor win their first trophy together by beating Victoria Azarenka and Max Mirnyi 6–4 6–4 in the final. australianopen.com

February
4 – Marcos Baghdatis defeats Ivan Ljubičić in the final of the Zagreb Indoor Open, 76(4) 46 64, to claim his 2nd career title.
4 – Xavier Malisse claimed his 200th career match win and 2nd Delray Beach title in three years by defeating American James Blake 5–7, 6–4, 6–4.
4 – Peruvian Luis Horna captured his second career ATP crown with a 7–5, 6–3 win in the Movistar Open final, causing Chilean Nicolás Massú to finish as the runner-up at his hometown tournament for the second straight year.

May
20 – Roger Federer won the AMS Hamburg final against Spaniard Rafael Nadal. It marked the first time that Federer could beat Nadal on clay and ended the Spaniard's 81-match winning streak (Open Era record) on clay.

July
8 – Roger Federer won his 5th straight Wimbledon Gentlemen's Singles title, an Open Era record he now shares with Swede Björn Borg. In the final he beat Nadal in five sets: 7–6, 4–6, 7–6, 2–6, 6–2.

August
8 – Novak Djokovic won the Canada Masters in Montréal beating Roger Federer in three sets.

September
8 – Justine Henin of Belgium won her second U.S. Open Women's Singles title. In the final she beat Russian Svetlana Kuznetsova in two sets.
9 – Roger Federer won his 4th straight U.S. Open Men's Singles title, an Open Era record. In the final he beat Serb Novak Djokovic in three sets: 7–6, 7–6, 6–4.

ITF

Grand Slam events

Australian Open (15 – 28 January)

Men's Singles:  Roger Federer d.  Fernando González, 7–6(7–2), 6–4, 6–4.
Women's Singles:  Serena Williams d.  Maria Sharapova, 6–1, 6–2.
Men's Doubles:  Bob Bryan &  Mike Bryan d.  Jonas Björkman &  Max Mirnyi, 7–5, 7–5.
Women's Doubles:  Cara Black &  Liezel Huber d.  Chan Yung-jan &  Chuang Chia-jung, 6–4, 6–7(4–7), 6–1.
Mixed Doubles:  Daniel Nestor &  Elena Likhovtseva d.  Max Mirnyi &  Victoria Azarenka, 6–4, 6–4.

French Open (27 May – 10 June)

Men's Singles:  Rafael Nadal d.  Roger Federer, 6–3, 4–6, 6–3, 6–4
Women's Singles:  Justine Henin d.  Ana Ivanovic, 6–1, 6–2
Men's Doubles:  Mark Knowles &  Daniel Nestor d.  Lukáš Dlouhý &  Pavel Vízner, 2–6, 6–3, 6–4
Women's Doubles:  Alicia Molik &  Mara Santangelo d.  Katarina Srebotnik &  Ai Sugiyama, 7–6(5), 6–4
Mixed Doubles:  Nathalie Dechy &  Andy Ram d.  Nenad Zimonjić &  Katarina Srebotnik, 7–5, 6–3

Wimbledon (25 June – 8 July)

Men's Singles:  Roger Federer d.  Rafael Nadal, 7–6(9–7), 4–6, 7–6(7–3), 2–6, 6–2
Women's Singles:  Venus Williams d.  Marion Bartoli, 6–4, 6–1
Men's Doubles:  Arnaud Clément &  Michaël Llodra d.  Bob Bryan &  Mike Bryan, 6–7(5), 6–3, 6–4, 6–4
Women's Doubles:  Cara Black &  Liezel Huber d.  Katarina Srebotnik &  Ai Sugiyama, 3–6, 6–3, 6–2
Mixed Doubles:  Jamie Murray &  Jelena Janković d.  Jonas Björkman &  Alicia Molik, 6–4, 3–6, 6–1.

U.S. Open (27 August – 9 September)

Men's Singles:  Roger Federer d.  Novak Djokovic, 7–6(4) 7–6(2) 6–4
Women's Singles:  Justine Henin d.  Svetlana Kuznetsova, 6–1, 6–3
Men's Doubles:  Simon Aspelin &  Julian Knowle d.  Lukáš Dlouhý &  Pavel Vízner, 7–5, 6–4
Women's Doubles:  Nathalie Dechy &  Dinara Safina d.  Chan Yung-jan &  Chuang Chia-jung, 6–4, 6–2
Mixed Doubles:  Victoria Azarenka &  Max Mirnyi d.  Meghann Shaughnessy &  Leander Paes, 6–4, (8)7–6

Davis Cup

World Group Draw

S-Seeded
U-Unseeded
 *Choice of ground

Final

World Group Playoffs

Date: 21–23 September

Fed Cup

World Group Draw

 S-Seeded
 U-Unseeded
 *Choice of ground

Final

Hopman Cup

The Hopman Cup is the Official Mixed Team Competition of the ITF, played at the Burswood Entertainment Complex, in Perth, Western Australia. 2007's was the 19th edition of the competition.
This year Russia's pairing of Dmitry Tursunov and Nadia Petrova defeated Tommy Robredo and Anabel Medina Garrigues of Spain in the Final.

Group A

Group B

The Final

ATP Tour

Tennis Masters Cup

Singles:  Roger Federer d.  David Ferrer, 6–2, 6–3, 6–2
Doubles:  Mark Knowles &  Daniel Nestor d.  Simon Aspelin &  Julian Knowle 6–2, 6–3

ATP Masters Series

Indian Wells, California, USA, outdoor hardcourt
Singles:  Rafael Nadal d.  Novak Djokovic 6–2, 7–5
Doubles:  Martin Damm &  Leander Paes d.  Jonathan Erlich &  Andy Ram 6–4, 6–4
Miami, Florida, USA, outdoor hardcourt
Singles:  Novak Djokovic d.  Guillermo Cañas 6–3, 6–2, 6–4
Doubles:  Bob Bryan &  Mike Bryan d.  Martin Damm &  Leander Paes 6–7(7), 6–3, 10–7
Monte Carlo, Monaco, outdoor clay
Singles:  Rafael Nadal d.  Roger Federer 6–4, 6–4
Doubles:  Bob Bryan &  Mike Bryan d.  Julien Benneteau &  Richard Gasquet 6–2, 6–1
Rome, Italy, outdoor clay
Singles:  Rafael Nadal d.  Fernando González 6–2, 6–2
Doubles:  Fabrice Santoro &  Nenad Zimonjić d.  Bob Bryan &  Mike Bryan 6–4, 6–7(4), 10–7
Hamburg, Germany, outdoor clay
Singles:  Roger Federer d.  Rafael Nadal 2–6, 6–2, 6–0
Doubles:  Bob Bryan &  Mike Bryan d.  Paul Hanley &  Kevin Ullyett 6–3, 6–4
Montréal, Canada, outdoor hardcourt
Singles:  Novak Djokovic d.  Roger Federer 7–6, 2–6, 7–6
Doubles:  Mahesh Bhupathi &  Pavel Vízner d.  Paul Hanley &  Kevin Ullyett 6–4, 6–4
Cincinnati, Ohio, USA, outdoor hardcourt
Singles:  Roger Federer d.  James Blake 6–1, 6–4
Doubles:  Jonathan Erlich &  Andy Ram d.  Bob Bryan &  Mike Bryan 4–6, 6–3, 13–11
Madrid, Spain, indoor hardcourt
Singles:  David Nalbandian d.  Roger Federer 1–6, 6–3, 6–3
Doubles:  Bob Bryan &  Mike Bryan d.  Mariusz Fyrstenberg &  Marcin Matkowski 6–3, 7–6(4)
Paris, France, indoor carpet
Singles:  David Nalbandian d.  Rafael Nadal 6–4, 6–0
Doubles:  Bob Bryan &  Mike Bryan d.  Daniel Nestor &  Nenad Zimonjić 6–3, 7–6(4)

ARAG ATP World Team Cup

 TP: Ties Played
 TW: Ties Won
 MW: Matches Won
 SW: Sets Won

Final

Argentina vs. Czech Republic

Sony Ericsson WTA Tour

WTA Tour Championships

Singles:  Justine Henin d.  Maria Sharapova 5–7, 7–5, 6–3
Doubles:  Cara Black &  Liezel Huber d.  Katarina Srebotnik &  Ai Sugiyama 5–7, 6–3, 10–8

WTA Tier I

Tokyo, Japan: Toray Pan Pacific Open, indoor carpet
Singles:  Martina Hingis d.  Ana Ivanovic 6–4, 6–2
Doubles:  Lisa Raymond &  Samantha Stosur d.  Vania King &  Rennae Stubbs 7–6(6), 3–6, 7–5
Indian Wells, California, USA: Pacific Life Open, outdoor hardcourt
Singles:  Daniela Hantuchová d.  Svetlana Kuznetsova 6–3, 6–4
Doubles:  Lisa Raymond &  Samantha Stosur d.  Chan Yung-jan &  Chuang Chia-jung 6–3, 7–5
Miami, Florida, USA: Sony Ericsson Open, outdoor hardcourt
Singles:  Serena Williams d.  Justine Henin 0–6, 7–5, 6–3
Doubles:  Lisa Raymond &  Samantha Stosur d.  Cara Black &  Liezel Huber 6–4 3–6 7–5
Charleston, South Carolina, USA: Family Circle Cup, outdoor clay
Singles:  Jelena Janković d.  Dinara Safina 6–2, 6–2
Doubles:  Zi Yan &  Jie Zheng d.  Shuai Peng &  Tiantian Sun 7–5, 6–0
Berlin, Germany: Qatar Total German Open, outdoor clay
Singles:  Ana Ivanovic d.  Svetlana Kuznetsova 3–6, 6–4, 7–6(4)
Doubles:  Lisa Raymond &  Samantha Stosur d.  Tathiana Garbin &  Roberta Vinci
Rome, Italy: Internazionali d'Italia, outdoor clay
Singles:  Jelena Janković d.  Svetlana Kuznetsova 7–5, 6–1
Doubles:  Nathalie Dechy &  Mara Santangelo d.  Tathiana Garbin &  Roberta Vinci 6–4, 6–1
San Diego, California, USA: Acura Classic, outdoor hardcourt
Singles:  Maria Sharapova d.  Patty Schnyder 6–2, 6–3, 6–0
Doubles:  Cara Black &  Liezel Huber d.  Victoria Azarenka &  Anna Chakvetadze 7–5, 6–4
Toronto, Canada: Rogers Cup presented by National Bank, outdoor hardcourt
Singles:  Justine Henin d.  Jelena Janković 7–6(3), 7–5
Doubles:  Katarina Srebotnik &  Ai Sugiyama d.  Cara Black &  Liezel Huber 6–4, 2–6, 10–5
Moscow, Russia: Kremlin Cup, indoor carpet
Singles:  Elena Dementieva d.  Serena Williams 5–7, 6–1, 6–1
Doubles:  Cara Black &  Liezel Huber d.  Victoria Azarenka &  Tatiana Poutchek 4–6, 6–1, 10–7
Zürich, Switzerland: Zürich Open, indoor hardcourt
Singles:  Justine Henin d.  Tatiana Golovin 6–4, 6–4
Doubles:  Květa Peschke &  Rennae Stubbs d.  Lisa Raymond &  Francesca Schiavone 7–5, 7–6(1)

Exhibition tournaments

AAMI Kooyong Classic
  Andy Roddick d.  Roger Federer 6–2, 3–6, 6–3

Watsons Water Champions Challenge
  Kim Clijsters d.  Maria Sharapova 6–3, 7–6(8)

River Oaks International Tennis Tournament
 Singles:  Dmitry Tursunov d.  Nicolás Massú 2–6, 1–0 (ret)
 Doubles:  Diego Hartfield &  Juan Mónaco d.  Paul Goldstein &  Jim Thomas 7–6(5), 2–6, 7–6(8)

Battle of Surfaces
  Rafael Nadal d.  Roger Federer 7–5, 4–6, 7–6(10)

Liverpool International Tennis Tournament
 Men's Singles:  David Ferrer d.  Vince Spadea 6–4, 6–4
 Women's Singles:  Ashley Harkleroad d.  Caroline Wozniacki 7–6(1), 3–6, [10–8]

Boodles Challenge
  Fernando Verdasco d.  David Nalbandián 6–3, 6–3

Turbo Tennis
 London:  Andy Murray d.  Goran Ivanišević 7–4
 Zaragoza:  David Ferrer d.  Rafael Nadal 7–5

Cachantún Beauty Challenge
  Gisela Dulko d.  Dominika Cibulková 6–2, 6–7(4), [10–8]

International Tennis Hall of Fame
Class of 2007:
Sven Davidson, player
Pete Sampras, player
Arantxa Sánchez Vicario, player
Russ Adams, contributor

 
Tennis by year